Leffingwell may refer to:

People
Albert Leffingwell (physician) (1845–1916), physician and reformer
Albert Leffingwell (novelist) (1895–1946), American novelist
Charles Wesley Leffingwell (1840–1928), American author, educator, and Episcopal priest
Edward Leffingwell (1941–2014), American art critic and curator
Ernest de Koven Leffingwell (1875–1971) arctic explorer, geologist
Lee Leffingwell (b. 1939), American mayor of Austin, Texas
Frank Seth Leffingwell (1868–1945), a politician who was elected to public office in both the United States and Canada.
William Henry Leffingwell (1876–1934), an American management author, and the founder of National Office Management Association.
Russell Cornell Leffingwell (1878–1960), American banker

Things
Leffingwell Camp Site
Leffingwell Inn

Places
Leffingwell Township, Ashtabula County, Ohio, renamed Orwell Township